Microgecko helenae, also known commonly as the banded dwarf gecko, Helen's banded dwarf gecko, Helen's tiny gecko, the Khuristan dwarf gecko, or the Khuzestan dwarf gecko, is a species of lizard in the family Gekkonidae. The species is endemic to western Iran.

Etymology
The specific name, helenae, is in honor of Helena Nikolsky.

References

Further reading
"Nikolski AM" (1907) ("1905"). "Reptiles et Amphibies, recueillis par Mr. N. A. Zaroudny en Perse en 1903–1904 ". Annuaire du Musée Zoologique de l'Académie Impériale des Sciences de St.-Pétersbourg 10 (3-4): 260-301 + Plate I. (Microgecko helenae, new species, pp. 265–268). (article in Latin and Russian, article title in French in table of contents of journal).

Microgecko
Reptiles described in 1907
Reptiles of Iran
Taxa named by Alexander Nikolsky